Anthony Kang (born November 30, 1972) is a Korean-American professional golfer.

Early life
Kang was born in South Korea, moving to live in the United States at the age of 10, where he attended Oregon State University.

Professional career
Kang turned professional in 1996. He has been a member of the Asian Tour since 1998 where he has won over a million US dollars in prize money.

Kang has had three victories on the Asian Tour, the most recent coming at the 2009 Maybank Malaysian Open, eight years after the previous one. The tournament was co-sanctioned with the European Tour, and the win also gave him a two-year exemption on that tour.

Professional wins (3)

European Tour wins (1)

1Co-sanctioned by the Asian Tour

Asian Tour wins (3)

1Co-sanctioned by the European Tour

Asian Tour playoff record (0–1)

Results in major championships

"T" = Tied
Note: Kang only played in the U.S. Open.

Results in World Golf Championships

"T" = Tied

External links 

American male golfers
Asian Tour golfers
European Tour golfers
Golfers from Phoenix, Arizona
Oregon State University alumni
South Korean emigrants to the United States
American sportspeople of Korean descent
1972 births
Living people